ID-kaart may refer to:

Belgian identity card                             
Dutch identity card
Estonian identity card